Meshir 14 - Coptic Calendar - Meshir 16

The fifteenth day of the Coptic month of Meshir, the sixth month of the Coptic year. In common years, this day corresponds to February 9, of the Julian Calendar, and February 22, of the Gregorian Calendar. This day falls in the Coptic Season of Shemu, the season of the Harvest.

Commemorations

Prophets 

 The martyrdom of the Righteous Zachariah the Prophet, the Son of Berechiah

Martyrs 

 The martyrdom of Saint Pigol the Priest

Saints 

 The departure of Saint Paphnoute the Monk

Other commemorations 

 The consecration of the first Church dedicated to the Forty Martyrs of Sebaste

References 

Days of the Coptic calendar